Peavey Guitars are electric, acoustic, and electric bass guitars branded by Peavey Electronics.

List of models

Guitars
Axcelerator Series
Axcelerator (made in USA 1994–1998)
Axcelerator AX (made in USA 1995–1998)
Axcelerator F (made in USA 1994)
Cropper Classic (made in USA)

Destiny Series
Destiny (made in USA 1989–1994)
Destiny Custom (made in USA 1989–1994)
Detonator Series
Detonator (made in USA)
Detonator AX (made in USA 1995–1998)
Detonator JX (made in USA)
EVH Wolfgang Series (1996–2004)
EVH Wolfgang
EVH Wolfgang Special
Falcon Series
Falcon (made in USA 1986–1988)
Falcon Active (made in USA 1988–1989)
Falcon Classic (made in USA 1988–1990)
Falcon Custom (Kahler tremolo – made in USA 1986–1988)
Falcon Custom (Power Bend II tremolo – made in USA 1989–1991)
Falcon 1 International Series (made in Korea)
Falcon Standard (made in USA 1989–1991)

Firenza Series
Impact Firenza (see Impact Series)
Firenza (made in Leakesville MS, USA 1998–2002)
Firenza AX (made in Leakesville MS, USA 1998–2002)
Firenza JX (made in Leakesville MS, USA 1998–2002)
G-90 (made in USA)
Generation Series
Generation Custom (made in USA 1989–1994)
Generation Custom ACM (made in USA)
Generation Custom EX
Generation EX (made in China)
Generation EXP
Generation EXP ACM (made in Korea)
Generation EXP Custom ACM
Generation S-1 (made in USA 1988–1994)
Generation S-2 (made in USA 1990–1994)
Generation S-3 (made in USA 1991–1994)
Generation Standard (made in USA 1989–1994)
Generation Triple/Single EX (made in China)
Generation Vintage EX (made in China)
Hartley Peavey Signature Series
Hartley Peavey Signature EX
Hartley Peavey Signature EXP (made in Korea)
Hartley Peavey Signature Select
Hartley Peavey Signature USA Custom (made in USA)
Hartley Peavey Special Series
Hartley Peavey Special CT USA (made in USA)
Hartley Peavey Special EX
Hartley Peavey Special USA (made in USA)
Horizon Series
Horizon (made in USA 1983–1986)
Horizon II (made in USA 1983–1986)
Horizon II Custom (made in USA 1984–1985)
Hydra Series
Hydra (made in USA)
Jeff Cook Signature Model (made in USA)
Impact Series
Impact 1 (made in USA 1985–1987); different model in the 1990s
Impact 1 Unity (made in USA 1987–1989)
Impact 2 (made in USA 1985–1987); different model in the 1990s
Impact Firenza (made in USA)
Impact Firenza AX (made in USA)
Impact Milano (made in USA)
Impact Torino I (made in USA)
Impact Torino II (made in USA)
Jack Daniel's Series
Jack Daniel's EX
Jack Daniel's EXP
Jack Daniel's USA (made in USA)
Jazz Fusion Series
JF-1 EXP (made in China) EX on guitar
JF-2 EXP (made in China)
 Limited Series
Limited HB (made in Leakesville, Mississippi, USA)
Limited ST (made in Leakesville, Mississippi, USA)
Limited VT (made in Leakesville, Mississippi, USA)
Limited STD (made in Leakesville, Mississippi, USA)
Mantis Series
Mantis (made in USA 1984–1986)
Mantis LT (made in USA)
Milestone Series
Milestone (made in USA 1983–1986)
Milestone 12-string (made in USA 1983–1986)
Mystic (made in USA 1983–1986)
Nitro Series
Nitro I (made in USA 1986–1989)
Nitro I Active (made in USA 1988–1990)
Nitro I Custom (made in USA 1987–1989)
Nitro II (made in USA 1987–1989)
Nitro III (made in USA 1987–1989)
Nitro III Custom (made in USA 1987–1989)
Nitro Limited (made in USA 1987–1990)
Nitro C-2 (made in USA 1990–1992)
Nitro C-3 (made in USA 1990–1992)
Odyssey Series
Odyssey (made in USA 1990–1994)
Odyssey 25th Anniversary (made in USA 1990–1994); 250 total
Odyssey Custom (made in USA 1990–1994)
Omniac JD USA (made in USA 2006–2009)
Patriot Series
Patriot (made in USA 1983–1986)
Patriot Plus (made in USA 1983–1986)
Predator Series
Predator (Kahler Flyer tremolo made in USA 1985–1988)
Predator (Power Bend tremolo made in USA)
Predator AX (made in USA 1995–1996)
Predator Plus (rosewood fingerboard version made in Korea and Vietnam)
Predator Plus (maple fingerboard version made in Vietnam only)
Predator Plus EXP (made in Korea and Indonesia)
Predator Plus HB (made in Korea)
PXD Series
PXD Tomb
PXD Tragic
PXD Twenty-Three
PXD Vicious
PXD DT Vicious (Devin Townsend signature model)
PXD Void
Raptor Series
Raptor I
Raptor II
Raptor III
Raptor Plus (made in Korea and China)
Raptor Plus EXP (made in Korea)
Raptor Plus TK (made in Korea)
Raptor Special
Razer (made in USA 1983–1986)
Reactor Series
Reactor (made in USA)
Reactor AX (made in USA 1995–1999)
Rockingham
Rotor Series
Rotor EX
Rotor EXP (bolt neck – made in Korea)
Rotor EXP (set neck – made in Korea)
Rotor EXP (locking tremolo – made in Indonesia)
Rotor EXP Limited (neck-through – made in Korea)
Rotor Special (single pickup)
SC Series
SC-1
SC-2
SC-3
T-Series
T-15 (made in USA 1982–1984)
T-25 (made in USA 1982–1983)
T-25 Special (made in USA 1982–1983)
T-26 (made in USA 1982–1983)
T-27 (made in USA 1982–1983)
T-27 Limited (made in USA 1982–1983)
T-30 (made in USA 1981–1983)
T-60 (made in USA 1978–1986)
Tracer Series
Tracer (Power Bend tremolo) (made in USA 1988–1994)

Tracer Custom (made in USA 1989–1990)
Tracer Custom '89 (made in USA 1989–1991)
Tracer Deluxe (made in USA 1988–1990)
Tracer Deluxe '89 (made in USA 1989–1991)
Tracer LT (made in USA 1991–1994)
Tracer II (made in USA 1989–1990)
Tracer II '89 (made in USA 1989–1991)
V-Type Series
V-Type NTB ST
V-Type NTB TR
V-Type EXP
V-Type U.S.A. (made in USA 2002–2004)
Vortex Series
Vortex 1 (made in USA 1985–1986)
Vortex 2 (made in USA 1985–1986)
Vortex EX
Vandenberg (made in USA)

Bass guitars

Axcelerator Series (made in USA)
4 String (discontinued)
5 String (discontinued)
6 String (discontinued)
Axcelerator 2-T (discontinued)
B-Quad (Brian Bromberg's signature, necks made by Modulus Guitars; made in USA)
4 String (discontinued)
5 String (discontinued)
BXP Series (made in Vietnam)
Cirrus Series (made in USA)
4 String (discontinued)
5 String (discontinued)
6 String (discontinued)
Cyberbass
4 String (discontinued)
5 String (discontinued)
TL (Tim Landers's Signature Series (made in USA)
TL-5 5 String (discontinued)
TL-6 String (discontinued)
Dyna-Bass Series (made in USA with design help from Tim Landers)
4 String (discontinued)
5 String (discontinued)
Forum Series (made in USA)
Forum P/J (discontinued)
Forum AX (discontinued)
Forum Plus (discontinued)
Foundation Series (made in USA) 
Foundation S P/J Schaller Pickups (discontinued); script logo
Foundation 4 String VFL Pickups (discontinued); block logo
Foundation 5 String VFL Pickups (discontinued); block logo
Foundation 2000 (discontinued); block Logo
Fury Series 4 string (made in USA)
1st Generation Super Ferrite (discontinued); script logo
2nd Generation Split P Bass Pickup (discontinued); block logo
3rd Generation Split P bass Pickup (discontinued); block logo
Forum P/J Version of 3rd Generation Fury (discontinued); block logo
Fury Series (made in Korea)
4 String (discontinued)
5 String (discontinued)
6 String (discontinued)
G-Bass (discontinued, made in USA)
Grind Bass USA (made in USA)
4 String P/J (discontinued)
5 String J/J (discontinued)
Grind Series (made in Vietnam/China)
4 String
5 String
6 String
Jack Daniel's USA
Midibase
4 String (discontinued)
Milestone Series (made in Korea)
4 String (discontinued)
5 String (discontinued)
Millennium & Millennium Plus USA
4 String JJ (discontinued)
5 String JJ (discontinued)
4 String J/MM (discontinued)
5 String J/MM (discontinued)
Millennium International Series (made in Korea or Indonesia)
4 String Passive (pictured)(discontinued)
4 String Active (discontinued)
5 String Passive (discontinued)
5 String Active (discontinued)
Patriot (made in USA – discontinued)
RJ IV Randy Jackson Signature (U.S.A.) (discontinued)
Sarzo Bass Rudy Sarzo Signature Model (U.S.A) (discontinued)
T-Series (made in USA) (discontinued)
T-20 (discontinued)
T-40 (1978; discontinued)
T-45 (discontinued)
Unity Passive (1990; made in USA – discontinued)
Unity Series (1991; made in USA – discontinued)
Unity Series Koa (1991; made in USA – discontinued)
VWB Verdine White Signature Model (made in USA – discontinued)
Zodiac Series (discontinued)
Zodiac BXP (discontinued)
Zodiac DE Scorpio (discontinued)

Acoustic guitars
Aberdeen
Briarwood DR Series
Briarwood CL-1
Briarwood DR-1
Briarwood DR-112
Briarwood DR-2ER
Briarwood DR-3ER CDS
Briarwood DR-3ERS
Briarwood DR-4CA EQ
Briarwood DR-4CA WR EQ
Briarwood DR-5CA EQ QT
Briarwood FL-1
Ecoustic Series
Ecoustic (made in USA)
Ecoustic ATS (made in USA)
Indianola
Jack Daniel's Series
Jack Daniel's JD-AG1
Jack Daniel's JD-AG2
Jack Daniel's JD-AG3
Route 61

Serial numbers
Serial numbers correlate to shipping dates of US models only.  1978 to 1995.  Imports designated by EX, EXP, or BXP are not serialized by year.
 ............................................1978
 ........................1978
 ........................1979
 ........................1980
 ........................1981
 ........................1982
 ........................1983
 ........................1984
 ........................1985
 ........................1986
 ........................1987
 ........................1988
 ........................1989
 ........................1990
 ........................1991
 ........................1992
 ........................1993
 ........................1994
.........................................1995

See also
Peavey Electronics
Hartley Peavey

References

External links
Peavey Electronics Official Website
Peavey Electronics Official Online Forums
The Wolfgang Registry
Peavey Wolfgang Website

Guitars
Peavey